Cruel Zinc Melodies is a fantasy novel by American writer Glen Cook, the twelfth novel in his ongoing Garrett P.I. series.  The series combines elements of mystery and fantasy as it follows the adventures of private investigator Garrett.

Plot introduction
Garrett is a hardboiled detective living in the city of TunFaire, a melting pot of different races, cultures, religions, and species.  When people have problems, they often come to Garrett for help, but trouble has a way of finding Garrett on its own, whether he likes it or not.

Plot summary
It's winter in TunFaire, and life has slowed down for Garrett (meaning work seldom intrudes to interrupt his beer drinking and lounging about), until a parade of lovely ladies led by his favorite fiery red-head makes its way through his door. The red-head in question is none other than Tinnie Tate, Garrett's girlfriend, and she's accompanied by Alyx Weider, sultry temptress and daughter of the local beer baron, and several other friends.  It turns out the girls have aspirations to become an acting troupe for a new theater that Alyx's father, Max Weider, is building to keep his youngest daughter happy and to have a new vehicle for moving more of his product.

The trouble is that Max needs some help.  It seems that construction of his theater, The World, is beset by ghosts, bugs, and break-ins.  Garrett figures that this is pretty much a security job, and ends up bringing in some of the usual crew including Saucerhead Tharpe and even Winger.

Right off the bat, Garrett wraps up the break-in problem, as it seems that a gang of kids was trying their hand at the racketeering business.  The ghosts and bugs present a bit more of a problem.  It turns out that the bugs are of sorcerous origin and the result of some sorcerous experimentation by a group of kids from the Hill, led by Kip Prose.  Worse yet, the bugs have been disturbing the sleep of a large entity from a bygone age that has been slumbering for eons beneath the ground that The World is being built upon.

With Garrett's knack for finding trouble, he ends up attracting attention from the Guard, Prince Rupert, and several nasty sorcerous types from The Hill. In the end, with the help of The Dead Man, John Stretch and his telepathically controlled rats, and a smoldering hot sorceress called the Windwalker Furious Tide of Light, Garrett eliminates the bugs and makes contact with the dormant creature (through the ghostly form of Eleanor), convincing it to be careful of the humans and creatures living above it.

Characters  
Garrett
The Dead Man
Dean
Pular Singe
Saucerhead Tharpe
Morley Dotes
Belinda Contague
Playmate
John Stretch
Colonel Westman Block
Deal Relway
Winger
Tinnie Tate
Max Weider
 Alyx Weider
 Windwalker Furious Tide of Light
Barate Algarda
Kip Prose
 Belle Chimes (The Bellman)
 Prince Rupert
 Link Dierber
 Schnook Avery

Garrett P.I.
2008 American novels
American fantasy novels

American mystery novels